The Rolling stock of the Lynton and Barnstaple Railway was one of the most distinctive aspects of the  narrow gauge line which ran for almost twenty miles across Exmoor in North Devon, England, from 1898 to 1935.

The locomotives appeared originally in a livery of plain lined green, and later on a black base, with chestnut under-frames, hauling passenger carriages coloured terracotta with off-white upper panels, and light grey goods wagons. The schemes were simplified as individual vehicles were repainted. With the take-over of the line by the Southern Railway in 1923, and the consequent arrival of a new locomotive - Lew - in 1925, the livery was slowly changed to the Southern Maunsell version for locos and passenger stock, and umber for the goods wagons. The loco headlamps which had been black under the L&B were re-painted red.

All of the original stock - sixteen passenger coaches and eighteen goods vehicles - were built to very high standards and supplied by the Bristol Wagon & Carriage Works.

Replicas of locomotives Lew (Lyd) and Lyn were built in 2010 and 2017, respectively.

Contractor's locomotives

Locomotives used during the construction of the railway

Original Rolling Stock (1898-1935)

Rolling stock of the original railway.

Locomotives

Passenger stock

Goods Stock

Modern Stock (1995 – present)

Non-original rolling stock of the revived railway

Locomotives

Coaching Stock 

As of May 2014, all passengers travel in restored original L&B Heritage Coaches, see table above

Goods Stock

Notes 

Lynton and Barnstaple Railway
Lynton